Other Angels is a 2010 Turkish drama film, directed by Emre Yalgın, which follows the lives of four transgender sex workers living together in the underbelly of Istanbul.

Plot
Sanem (Didem Soylu) is a prostitute who shares the same flat with three transvestites in Istanbul. Every day she dreams of a savior who will one day take her away from this life. One day a young man named Gökhan (Kanbolat Görkem Arslan) moves into the neighborhood, and soon Sanem attracts his attention. Sanem has to move out of her shared flat because of a number of problems that arise with her flatmates and she moves in with Gökhan. This will be the beginning of a journey during which both will question each other's reliability and their choices in life.

See also
 2010 in film
 Turkish films of 2010

References

External links
  for the film (Turkish)
 

2010 drama films
2010 LGBT-related films
2010 films
Films set in Turkey
Transgender-related films
Turkish drama films
2010s Turkish-language films
Turkish LGBT-related films
LGBT-related drama films